James Kaldis (20 August 1932 – 3 March 2007) was a Greek-born Australian politician. He was a Labor member of the New South Wales Legislative Council from 1978 to 1999.

Kaldis was born in Greece, migrated to Australia in 1950, and became a citizen in 1954. He worked as a journalist and newspaper editor, and then as an actor and stage director. He was a founding member and licensee of the radio station 2EA (later SBS Radio), and directed the Greek programmes for the station. He was also a founding member of the Ethnic Communities Council and was involved in various migrant organisations. In 1978 he was elected to the New South Wales Legislative Council as a Labor member, where he served until his retirement in 1999. He died in Sydney in 2007.

References

1932 births
2007 deaths
Members of the New South Wales Legislative Council
Australian Labor Party members of the Parliament of New South Wales
20th-century Australian politicians
Greek emigrants to Australia
Naturalised citizens of Australia